Another Late Night: Howie B is a DJ mix album, mixed by Howie B. It was the second in the Another Late Night series and was released by Late Night Tales on 24 July 2001.

Track listing
"What It Is?" – The Undisputed Truth
"Love's Theme" – Love Unlimited Orchestra
"Twilight" – Maze featuring Frankie Beverly
"I Changed My Mind" (Stereo MCs Rattlesnake Mix) – Lyrics Born and The Poets of Rhythm
"Uplink" – Stratus
"Mirage" – Santana
"Walking in Rhythm" – The Blackbyrds
"Summer Hot" – Curtis Mayfield
"Contrazoom" – Spacer featuring Alison Goldfrapp
"Respiration" – Black Star
"Work the Angles" – Dilated Peoples
"Heavy Tune" – Gong
"Under the Boardwalk" – Howie B
"Violet Don't Be Blue" – Herbie Mann

References

Howie B
Albums produced by Howie B
2001 compilation albums
Howie B albums